Parsonage Road Historic District is a national historic district located at Cochecton in Sullivan County, New York.  The district includes 10 contributing buildings.  The district included houses and related outbuildings located along a short street set in a natural landscape.  They were built between about 1820 and 1900 and reflect a number of popular 19th-century architectural styles including Federal, Greek Revival, and Queen Anne style.

It was listed on the National Register of Historic Places in 1992.

References

Historic districts on the National Register of Historic Places in New York (state)
Houses on the National Register of Historic Places in New York (state)
Queen Anne architecture in New York (state)
Greek Revival architecture in New York (state)
Federal architecture in New York (state)
Historic districts in Sullivan County, New York
Houses in Sullivan County, New York
National Register of Historic Places in Sullivan County, New York